Saah Nyumah (born 2 July 1997) is a Liberian footballer who plays for LISCR as a midfielder.

Career
Born in Vonjama, Nyumah has played for Red Lions, Wassaman United and LISCR.

He made his international debut for Liberia in 2015.

References

1997 births
Living people
Liberian footballers
Liberia international footballers
Red Lions FC (Liberia) players
Emmanuel Stars F.C. players
LISCR FC players
Association football midfielders
Liberian expatriate footballers
Liberian expatriate sportspeople in Ghana
Expatriate footballers in Ghana